Hyaenanche globosa is a species of plant under the family Picrodendraceae. It is the sole member of the genus Hyaenanche and the subtribe Hyaenanchinae. It is endemic to Cape Province in South Africa.

See also
 Taxonomy of the Picrodendraceae

References

Picrodendraceae
Monotypic Malpighiales genera
Flora of South Africa